Amylotheca is a genus of hemi-parasitic aerial shrubs in the family Loranthaceae, found in Borneo, Malaysia, New Caledonia, New Guinea, Australia (in New South Wales and Queensland), Sumatra, Thailand, Vanuatu, and Philippines

Description
The genus Amylotheca is distinguished from other Australian Loranthaceae genera by having
Petals which are united to the middle or higher
Six petals
A straight corolla tube
 epicortical runners
inflorescences usually a raceme of triads on a single raceme.

Species

Accepted species according to Plants of the world online 
Amylotheca acuminatifolia Barlow
Amylotheca dictyophleba (F.Muell.) Tiegh.
Amylotheca duthieana (King) Danser
Amylotheca subumbellata Barlow
Reference:

Recent Publication 
Amylotheca cleofei Tandang, Galindon & A.S.Rob.

Ecology
An inventory of host plants for Amylotheca  spp. is given by Downey

Taxonomy
Amylotheca is a  member of the family Loranthaceae within the mistletoe order, Santalales. The name Amylotheca was first published by Philippe Édouard Léon Van Tieghem in 1895,

Etymology
The genus name, Amylotheca, derives from the Latin, amylum (starch), and theca (case), and refers to the starch cells in the locules of the ovary.

References

External links
 
 

 
Parasitic plants
Loranthaceae genera
Taxa named by Philippe Édouard Léon Van Tieghem
Plants described in 1894